Michael A. Rowe (born March 8, 1965) is a Canadian former professional ice hockey defenceman who played eleven games in the National Hockey League for the Pittsburgh Penguins between 1985 and 1986. He also played in the British Hockey League between 1988 ad 1995.

Career statistics

Regular season and playoffs

References

External links
 

1965 births
Living people
Baltimore Skipjacks players
Basingstoke Beavers players
Canadian expatriate ice hockey players in England
Canadian expatriate ice hockey players in the United States
Canadian expatriate ice hockey players in Scotland
Canadian ice hockey defencemen
Fife Flyers players
Ice hockey people from Ontario
Muskegon Lumberjacks players
Pittsburgh Penguins players
Pittsburgh Penguins draft picks
Sportspeople from Kingston, Ontario
Toronto Marlboros players
Whitley Warriors players